Magny-Danigon is a commune in the Haute-Saône department in the region of Bourgogne-Franche-Comté in eastern France.

See also
Communes of the Haute-Saône department
Arthur de Buyer Coal Mine is based in the commune.

References

Communes of Haute-Saône